A Liberal Passion is a 2013 Italian comedy film co-written and directed by Marco Ponti. It is loosely based on the novel Passione sinistra by Chiara Gamberale. For her performance Eva Riccobono was nominated for Nastro D'Argento for best supporting actress.

Plot 
Nina and Bernardo live together. The first is an idealist, fixated on politics and decidedly leftist, convinced that everything she does can guarantee a better world. The second is an intellectual and writer, but destined to make the "eternal promise" for life. At the same time, Giulio, arrogant and indifferent, is engaged to Simonetta, a blonde dazed who sometimes stumbles on the subjunctives. Nina and Giulio casually meet and from the first moment they hate each other; in fact each sees the world with different eyes than the other. The boundary between love and hate, however, is very blurred and so they are overwhelmed by passion. All this brings into play the beliefs and ideals of two people who should be natural enemies.

Cast  
Valentina Lodovini as Nina
Alessandro Preziosi as Giulio
Vinicio Marchioni as Bernardo
Eva Riccobono as Simonetta
Geppi Cucciari as Martina
Jurij Ferrini as Serge
Glen Blackhall as Andrea Splendore
Rosabell Laurenti Sellers as Angelica 
Mao as Barman
Marco Travaglio as himself

See also
 List of Italian films of 2013

References

External links

2013 comedy films
2013 films
Italian comedy films
Films directed by Marco Ponti
Films based on Italian novels
2010s Italian-language films
2010s Italian films